The Warrington Cavaillé-Coll Organ is housed in Parr Hall in Warrington (UK). It is one of the few surviving pipe organs in the UK that were built by the French organ builder Aristide Cavaillé-Coll (1811–99).

History

Bracewell Hall

The pipe organ was built in 1870 for John Turner Hopwood, a lawyer and Liberal MP for Clitheroe, and was installed in his house at Bracewell Hall, Barnoldswick, Lancashire (demolished 1950). According to reports in The Musical World the completion of the organ - which cost more than £3,000 - was commemorated with three days of organ recitals by Dr William Spark the civic organist of Leeds.

The large music room (in which the organ is placed) [... is] 63 feet long, 25 feet wide and 30 feet high. Nothing can be finer than the view of the organ as you approach it from the dining room, rising, as it does, to the very roof, and occupying the whole breadth of the western end. The pipes in the front towers of the noble looking case of Gothic style, are made of pure tin, having the appearance of burnished silver.

Ketton Hall

In about 1883 the organ was then moved by Turner Hopwood to Ketton Hall, Rutland (demolished 1920s).

Warrington
The organ was bought by Warrington Corporation and installed in the Parr Hall in 1926, still with its original specification.

In 1969 the Warrington Corporation decided that a £9,000 restoration of the instrument was not a viable proposition. But following a publicity drive by local people who formed the Cavaillé-Coll Organ Retention Committee the Corporation agreed to retain the organ if the money could be raised. The Corporation generously added to the sum raised by the Committee to ensure that essential maintenance work went ahead. On completion of the work a celebratory concert took place, on 23 November 1972, featuring the organists Gilbert Kennedy and Nicholas Kynaston, with massed Warrington choirs.

In late 2006 Warrington Borough Council decided that the modern needs of the venue and its continued viability meant that a new home would be sought for the organ. Sheffield Cathedral was a potential new home for the organ, but by September 2011 it was clear that the Cathedral authorities would be unable to raise the substantial sum needed to move and restore the organ. Subsequent discussions have taken place to consider the instrument's move from the Parr Hall to St. Mary's Church, Warrington.

In 2015 the national-heritage significance of the instrument was recognized by the award of a Grade 1 Historic Organ certificate by the British Institute of Organ Studies, the UK's amenity society for the pipe organ. In 2017 the future of this wonderful civic instrument remains uncertain.

Recordings
Several CD recordings of the organ in the Parr Hall have been made.

 Roger Fisher (1984/2011). Roger Fisher plays the Cavaillé-Coll Organ in The Parr Hall, Warrington.
 Murray Stewart (1995) Louis Vierne: ‘Symphony No 1’ & ‘24 pièces en style libre’   (extracts).
 Roger Fisher (1996). Roger Fisher plays the Cavaillé-Coll Organ in the Parr Hall, Warrington].
 Aldert Winkelman (2004). César Franck ‘L`organiste’ (Volume 1).

Further reading
 KENNEDY, Gilbert. 'A Queen in Distress'. Organist's Review (October 1971) [n.p.]
 STEWART, Murray. ‘The Warrington Cavaillé-Coll’. The Musical Times, Vol. 121, No. 1644 (Feb., 1980), pp. 127–128
 SUMNER, Gerald. 'L'orgue Cavaillé-Coll de Bracewell (1870) et son transfert à Ketton (1875) puis au Parr Hall de Warrington (1928) / The Cavaillé-Coll organ at Bracewell Hall (1870), Ketton Hall (1875) and the Parr Hall at Warrington (1928)'. La Flûte Harmonique (Paris: L'Association Aristide Cavaille-Coll) No. 99, 2017. Special edition in French and English. ISSN 0398-9038.
 SUMNER, W. L. 'The Cavaillé-Coll Organ in the Parr Hall, Warrington'. [[The Organ (magazine)|The Organ]], no.134 (Oct 1954) [n.p]
 [——-]. Warrington and District Organists and Choirmasters' Association Syllabus of Meetings: 1923/4-1941/2, 1943/4-1946/7, 1948/9-1949/50, 1951/2-1954/5, 1956/7, 1961/2, 1963/4-1966/7.

External links
 'Lancashire Warrington, Parr Hall, Palmyra Square [N01653]', organ specification, listed on the National Pipe Organ Register, online resource, accessed 27 June 2019.
 L'Association Aristide Cavaillé-Coll. Online resource in French, accessed 15 July 2018
 Warrington Cavaillé-Coll Organ. Facebook Group. Online resource, accessed 27 June 2019

References

Warrington
Individual pipe organs